The Punjab Women's League, also known as JCT Punjab Women's League, is the top division of women's football league in the Indian state of Punjab. The league is organised by the Punjab Football Association (PFA), the official football governing body of the state. The first edition was held in 2018.

Venue
The matches are held at GNDU Sports Complex, CRPF Sports Complex and Khalsa College Ground.

Clubs

2021–22 season
The teams participating in the 2021–22 season:

Champions

References

Women's football leagues in India
Football in Punjab, India
Football leagues in India
2018 establishments in Punjab, India
Sports leagues established in 2018